The 2014 Elite Gym Massilia competition was a competition held in Marseille, France from November 14–16.

Medal winners 
Master Massilia

Result

Team Final

All-Around

External links
  Official site

2014 in gymnastics
2014 in French sport
Sport in Marseille